Stouffville is the primary urban area within the town of Whitchurch-Stouffville in York Region, Ontario, Canada. It is situated within the Greater Toronto Area and the inner ring of the Golden Horseshoe. The urban area is centred at the intersection of Main Street (York Regional Road 14), Mill Street, and Market Street. Between 2006 and 2011, the population of the Community of Stouffville grew 100.5% from 12,411 to 24,886, or from 51% to 66% of the total population of the larger town of Whitchurch-Stouffville.

History
Founded in 1804 by Abraham Stouffer, the hamlet was originally named Stoufferville. Stouffer built a sawmill and grist-mill on the banks of Duffin's Creek in the 1820s. The community name was shortened to Stouffville when its first post office opened in 1832.

In 1877, Stouffville became an incorporated village. On January 1, 1971, the Village of Stouffville amalgamated with Whitchurch Township and was designated a community within the larger town of Whitchurch-Stouffville; with amalgamation, the boundary of the town was also moved four farm lots south of the original boundary of Main Street (the land was formerly a part of Markham Township). The population of urban Stouffville in 1971 was 5,036.

In 2003, a large 16th-century Huron village was discovered in Stouffville during land development; approximately 2000 people once inhabited the site, dubbed Mantle Site, which included a palisade and more than 80 longhouses, yielding tens of thousands of artifacts.

Geography
Urban Stouffville is approximately 4.5 km long, stretching from the York-Durham Line to Highway 48, and approximately 2.7 km wide with development north and south of Main Street. Stouffville is bounded by farmland and a golf course. The community is located on the Oak Ridges Moraine and the Rouge River watershed.

Transportation
GO Transit's Stouffville line passes through the community with commuter trains stopping at the Stouffville GO Station in the downtown core and terminating at Old Elm GO Station. When no trains are scheduled a bus service from Toronto serves the town with some runs continuing to Uxbridge.

York Region Transit's bus#15 travels around the community of Stouffville and along the Stouffville Road to Yonge Street in Richmond Hill, and their bus#9 (9th line) travels from the town to Markham Stouffville Hospital and thence to Box Grove Plaza.

Stouffville Road (Regional Road #14) is the main east-west route that passes through downtown and connects with Highway 404 in the west.

Demographics
In 2006, urban Stouffville had a population of 8,000 to 10,000 people, or about one-third of the population of the larger Town of Whitchurch-Stouffville. The Town of Whitchurch-Stouffville estimates that the population grew more than 58% between 2006 and 2011; most of that growth was limited to the Community of Stouffville or the Community of Ballantrae. By 2021, the town’s total population forecast is projected to be approximately 55,800 persons, with an estimated 41,000 persons residing within the Community of Stouffville proper.

Growth
With connection to a massive new sewage system (also known as the Big Pipe) and a water pipe from Lake Ontario, urban Stouffville began to grow rapidly after 2005. The first of the new subdivisions were south of Main Street along Hoover Park Drive (Wheler's Mill and Wheler's on Main subdivisions), and north of Main Street along Millard Street west of Ninth Line.

In 2008, construction began to widen Stouffville Road / Main Street from two lanes to four lanes, from  Ninth Line to the edge of urban Stouffville at Highway 48 (the community of Ringwood), and further to McCowan Road. Construction was completed in June 2010. Stouffville Road has since been widened up to Highway 404.

Notable residents
 Keith Acton, National Hockey League player and coach
 Capt. Arthur Roy Brown DSC and Bar, RNAS (23 December 1893 – 9 March 1944), World War I flying ace who spent the latter years of his life running a farm in Stouffville.
 Michael Del Zotto, National Hockey League player
 Nicole Dollanganger, musician
 Dalton Kellett, racing driver
 Liz Knox, Canadian Women's Hockey League player; Professional Women's Hockey Players Association founding board member and player
 Jeff Marek, NHL and CHL analyst for Sportsnet
 Brad May, National Hockey League player; Stanley Cup winner with the Anaheim Ducks
 Jane Philpott, former President of the Treasury Board and MP of the Liberal Party of Canada
 Dean Michael Wiwchar, hitman.
 (See also Notable residents, Whitchurch-Stouffville)

Nearest communities
Urban Stouffville is situated in the southeast corner of the town of Whitchurch-Stouffville. Neighbouring communities within the town include Ringwood and Gormley to the east, and Bloomington to the north. Claremont, Uxbridge, and the ghost town of Altona (part of Pickering) lie to the east. Stouffville is bordered on the south by the city of Markham.

Heritage and culture

List of historic buildings

 Bloomington Gospel Church - 13660 9th Line 1874
 Bogarttown Public School 1857 - now part of Whitchurch-Stouffville Museum 
 Co-Op Grain Elevator c. 1916 – demolished 2015
 James Brown Homestead 1850s - last lived in 1950s and transferred to Whitchurch-Stouffville Museum in 1984
 Lebovic Centre for Arts & Entertainment – Nineteen on the Park 1896 - Romanesque Revival market/concert hall
 St James Presbyterian Church 6432 Main Street 1894
 Stouffville Memorial Christian Church - 6528 Main Street 1892
 Stouffville Station 1871 - built by Toronto and Nipissing Railway, then as Grant Trunk Stouffville Junction and demolished in 1980s and replaced by current GO station
 Stouffville Wesley Church 15296 Woodbine Avenue 1881
 Vandorf Public School 1871 - now moved to Whitchurch-Stouffville Museum (14732 Woodbine Avenue)

Stouffville Farmer's Country Market / Downtown Farmer's Market

The town was home to the Farmers Country Market, founded 1952, which sold a variety of produce, prepared foods, live animals, and household items. While once a popular town attraction, the market closed in 2016 after years of decline. The land was sold in 2001 and was slated for re-development during the decade after the sale. Current barn, silo and stalls were demolished following the closure of the site in late 2016. The Liquidation Centre was moved online with pick-up location/cash and carry in Uxbridge, Ontario. Vendors either closed or relocated across the GTA.

Nearby was a downtown farmer's street market hosted by the town and ran from 2009 to 2016. It too has closed and unsure if it will be opened again.

References

Citations

General references

External links
 Town of Whitchurch-Stouffville

Communities in Whitchurch-Stouffville
Populated places established in 1804